Machhlishahr is a constituency of the Uttar Pradesh Legislative Assembly covering the city of Machhlishahr in the Jaunpur district of Uttar Pradesh, India.

Machhlishahr is one of five assembly constituencies in the Machhlishahr Lok Sabha constituency. Since 2008, this assembly constituency is numbered 369 amongst 403 constituencies.

Members of the Legislative Assembly

Election results

2022

2017
Samajwadi Party candidate Jagdish Sonkar won in 2017 Uttar Pradesh Legislative Elections defeating Bharatiya Janta Party candidate Anita Rawat by a margin of 4,179 votes.

References

External links
 

Assembly constituencies of Uttar Pradesh
Politics of Jaunpur district